Jörg Lehnigk (born 8 January 1980 in Greifswald) is a German rower.

References 
 
 

1980 births
Living people
People from Greifswald
Olympic rowers of Germany
Rowers at the 2008 Summer Olympics
World Rowing Championships medalists for Germany
German male rowers
Sportspeople from Mecklenburg-Western Pomerania